New York's 50th State Senate district is one of 63 districts in the New York State Senate. It has been represented by Democrat John Mannion since 2021, succeeding Republican Bob Antonacci, who was elected as a justice of the New York Supreme Court.

Geography
District 50, centered around the suburbs of Syracuse, covers parts of Onondaga County and Cayuga County in Central New York.

The district is located entirely within New York's 22nd and 24th congressional districts and overlaps with the 120th, 126th, 127th, 128th, 129th, and 130th districts of the New York State Assembly.

Recent election results

2020

2018

2016

2014

2012

Federal results in District 50

References

50